Rajrani Meera (Rajrani Mira) is a 1933 Hindi devotional film. It was directed by Debaki Bose for New Theatres Ltd. Calcutta. The cinematographer was Nitin Bose with music composed by R. C. Boral. The film was a bilingual, made in Bengali as Meerabai and directed by Hiren Bose and Basanta Chatterjee. The film starred Durga Khote,  Prithviraj Kapoor, K. L. Saigal, Pahari Sanyal, Molina Devi and Indubala. K. L. Saigal had a small part that of a devotee in the film with Prithviraj Kapoor playing the male protagonist role.

The story revolves around the sixteenth-century saint-poet Mirabai, who suffers through hardships from her husband's family in her love for Lord Krishna, finally renouncing her family and palace to wander as a mendicant, writing bhakti poetry.

Plot
Meera (Durga Khote), is immersed in her love and devotion to Lord Krishna since a young age. When she grows older, her family get her married to the Rana of Mewar Prithviraj Kapoor. Misunderstandings occur when her devotional poetry is thought to be love songs for someone. Several hardships are inflicted on her by her husband and her in-laws. She takes to sitting in the temple and singing bhajans (sacred songs) composed by her. Her brother-in-law tries to have her killed many times, but fails. She finally renounces her life in the palace and wanders from place to place singing devotional songs.

Cast
Durga Khote as Mira Rani
Prithviraj Kapoor as King of Mewar, Rana Kumbha
K. L. Saigal
Pahari Sanyal as Chand Batta
Molina Devi as Sunanda
Indubala as Charani
Kamala Devi
Ansari
Khatoon
Sankatha Prasad
Siddiqui

Mirabai remakes
The devotional films had many male saints to focus on, but the only female saint-poet who caught the interest of the film-makers was Meera bai. Several films have been made in India on the subject of Meera bai since the time of silent era. In 1921 itself there were two, Kanjibhai Rathod's Meerabai (1921) and Ramnik Desai’s Meerabai (1921). In 1933 was the Hindi|Bengali Rajrani Meera/Meerabai.
The other popular film was Meera (1945), by Ellis Duncan who made it as a bilingual in Tamil and Hindi. Both films had the vocals of the famous Carnatic singer  M. S. Subbalakshmi. Many prominent film directors like Kidar Sharma, Nanabhai Bhatt and Gulzar made films on the story of Meera bai.

Soundtrack

Track listing

References

External links

 Rajrani Meera (1933) on indiancine.ma

1933 films
1930s Hindi-language films
Indian historical drama films
1930s historical drama films
Indian black-and-white films
1933 drama films